Petelinjek pri Ločah is a dispersed settlement in the Municipality of Slovenske Konjice in eastern Slovenia. It lies in the hills north of Loče on the left bank of the Dravinja River. The area is part of the traditional region of Styria. The municipality is now included in the Savinja Statistical Region.

Name
The name of the settlement was changed from Petelinjek to Petelinjek pri Ločah in 1999.

References

External links
Petelinjek pri Ločah at Geopedia

Populated places in the Municipality of Slovenske Konjice